Kavitha Maloth (born 1981) is an Indian politician and a Member of Parliament from Mahbubabad constituency. She is the daughter of Redya Nayak, and started her political career in 2009 with Indian National Congress, she elected as MLA of Mahabubabad in 2009 general election.

Early life
Kavitha Maloth was born in Banjara community. she is daughter of leader Redya Naik.

Career
Maloth was elected from Mahbubabad constituency in 2019,

She is married to Bhadru Naik.

References

Telangana politicians
Living people
Women in Telangana politics
People from Hanamkonda district
21st-century Indian women politicians
21st-century Indian politicians
India MPs 2019–present
1981 births